East Berkshire Golf Club is a golf club, located in Crowthorne, Berkshire, England. It was established in 1903.

The course was designed by Peter Paxton.

References

Golf clubs and courses in Berkshire
1903 establishments in England